Burnyush (Burnış) is a rural locality (a village) in Novokainlykovsky Selsoviet, Krasnokamsky District, Bashkortostan, Russia. The population was 197 as of 2010. There are 2 streets.

Geography 
Burnyush is located 69 km south of Nikolo-Beryozovka (the district's administrative centre) by road. Kirgizovo is the nearest rural locality.

References 

Rural localities in Krasnokamsky District